Keith E. McGee (born May 7, 1981) is an American professional stock car racing driver who competes part-time in the NASCAR Craftsman Truck Series, driving the No. 34 for Reaume Brothers Racing. He has also competed in what is now the ARCA Menards Series West in the past.

McGee also previously served in the United States Air Force for eight years. McGee is notable for being the first Alaskan and the first disabled veteran in NASCAR history to race at a National series event.

Racing career

Early career

McGee was interested in racing as a child, but he either could become a professional snowboarder  or go to the military, and he chose the latter. After moving from California to Alaska and serving for eight years in the United States Air Force beginning in 2001, he started racing when a go-kart facility opened near his town of Eagle River, Alaska. At the time, he was age 35.

He competed in 115 local go-karting events in 2017, racking up 78 wins. He competed in the Extreme Racing League, a go-kart series in its first year, where he won every race on the way to the championship. In 2018, McGee competed in the NASCAR Whelen All-American Series, finishing second in points and driving at his home track, Alaska Raceway Park. He also won the championship in the Pro Grand National Series.

NASCAR and ARCA

McGee made his debut in the NASCAR K&N Pro Series West at the 2018 season-finale at Kern County Raceway Park in the No. 39 for Patriot Motorsports Group, but finished last, not finishing the race due to clutch issues.

For 2019, McGee had been announced to run at the Tucson doubleheader race in one of the Jefferson Pitts Racing cars, but this did not end up happening. His first start of the year came at Douglas County Speedway in Oregon in June of that year. He drove the No. 37 and finished 11th. He later got his first top-10 in his next race at Meridian Speedway in Idaho. It was just his third start in the West Series.

McGee stated in an interview for the Racing-Reference website that he was hoping to run full-time in the ARCA Series and also make his Truck Series debut in 2020. He did drive an ARCA Menards Series car for the first time at the series' Daytona testing in January 2020, driving for Our Motorsports in the No. 02 car (along with Andy Seuss, Sebastian Arias, and Ronnie Osmer). McGee ended up not running the race there in February (Seuss and Benny Chastain filled the seats of team's two cars in that race), nor any others for the team and in the series in 2020. On the Truck side, McGee did try to attempt to make his Truck debut at Talladega, driving the No. 33 for Reaume Brothers Racing, but those plans were called off and postponed once he was not approved to race there. With his first start in the series coming at a restrictor plate track during the COVID-19 pandemic, where NASCAR cancelled all practice and qualifying for the race, McGee would have gotten behind the wheel of a truck for the first time in the race, which NASCAR was against (the same thing happened in June to James Davison in the Cup Series, also at Talladega). As a result, RBR stated that he would make his Truck debut for them sometime in 2021. On January 18, 2021, Reaume announced that McGee's first race would be at Richmond, and that he would be in the No. 33, which would be a Chevy in that race. In addition, the team stated that he could run more races in 2021 if sponsorship could be found. On May 25, 2021, McGee announced that he would be competing in the race at Charlotte in the No. 3 for Jordan Anderson Racing. After previously sponsoring Matt DiBenedetto in 2019 and Clint Bowyer in 2020, both in the NASCAR Cup Series, Barstool Sports returned to NASCAR as McGee's sponsor in this race. McGee later drove the No. 49 CMI Motorsports Ford at the Victoria's Voice Foundation 200. In his last appearance of the year at Talladega Superspeedway, he was one of only five  trucks that finished clean, leading a lap and running in the top 15 for the final 20 laps; avoiding a last lap crash, he slipped to tenth for his best finish of the season.

Personal life

McGee grew up in Nevada County, California, and is the youngest of seven children in his family. He moved from California to Alaska in 2005 when he was serving in the military. However, after his service ended, he did not move back to California and remained in Alaska living there permanently. He got a job as a RADAR specialist for the U.S. Department of Defense.

His grandfather worked on and built racecars for drivers on the west coast of the U.S. McGee and his father, also involved in racing as a driver for Factory Polaris, would also watch NASCAR races on TV and attend local Sprint car races in person. McGee's mother competed in the 1988 Winter Olympics in Calgary and won a gold medal after being diagnosed with multiple sclerosis earlier in her life and being told she would not be able to walk again. His mother is also a cancer survivor, which is why McGee often runs with Breast Cancer Awareness ribbons on his West Series cars and has run some races with his car number being the color pink.

Motorsports career results

NASCAR
(key) (Bold – Pole position awarded by qualifying time. Italics – Pole position earned by points standings or practice time. * – Most laps led.)

Craftsman Truck Series

K&N Pro Series West

 Season still in progress

References

External links
 
 

Living people
1981 births
NASCAR drivers
ARCA Menards Series drivers
Racing drivers from Alaska